Mega Drive Advanced Gaming was a magazine that focused on the Sega Mega Drive video game console, but would also cover the Mega-CD and 32X. Launched by Maverick Magazines around the same time as Future's MEGA in August 1992, with issue 1 cover dated as September 1992.

In 1995 the magazine ceased publication. Hugh Gollner, publisher and owner of Maverick Magazines, granted the magazine preservation project permission to scan, edit and release the back issues of Mega Drive Advanced Gaming.

Mega Drive Advanced Gaming was the launch-title for Maverick Magazines. Early on in its life, it was recognised by the Audit Bureau of Circulations as the best-selling Mega Drive magazine in the UK.

References

External links
 Archived Mega Drive Advanced Gaming magazines on the Internet Archive

Defunct computer magazines published in the United Kingdom
Magazines established in 1992
Magazines disestablished in 1995
Mass media in Oxford
Monthly magazines published in the United Kingdom
Video game magazines published in the United Kingdom
Sega magazines
Sega Genesis